Kretinga District Municipality is one of 60 municipalities in Lithuania.

Locations in Kretinga District Municipality
 Erškėtynas Stream and Chapel
 Gargždelė
 Kretinga
 Salantai

Elderships 
Kretinga District Municipality is divided into 9 elderships:

References 

Municipalities of Klaipėda County
Municipalities of Lithuania